Uranium production is carried out in about 13 countries around the world, in 2017 producing a cumulative total of 59,462 tonnes of uranium (tU). The international producers were Kazakhstan (39%), Canada (22%), Australia (10%), Namibia (7.1%), Niger (5.8%), Russian Federation (4.9%), Uzbekistan (4.0%), China (3.2%), United States (1.6%), Ukraine (0.9%), India (0.7%), South Africa (0.5%) and Pakistan (0.1%). Since 2009 the in-situ leach (ISL) operations of Kazakhstan have been producing the largest share of world uranium.

The largest conventional uranium mines are Cigar Lake and McArthur River (Canada); Ranger and Olympic Dam (Australia); Krasnokamensk (Russia) and Rossing (Namibia). The largest uranium producers are Cameco, Rio Tinto, Areva, KazAtomProm and ARMZ-TVEL.

The production methods employed are conventional underground and open cast (50%) and in-situ leaching (50%). About 50 uranium production centers are operational.

Viable projects

Potentially viable projects

Non-viable projects

Prospective projects and decommissioned mines

See also

 List of countries by uranium reserves
 Uranium market
 Uranium ore deposits
 Mining
 Uranium
 List of countries by uranium production

Notes

References
Uranium 2007: Resources, Production and Demand (Red Book) (2008) OECD-NEA and IAEA

External links
World Distribution of Uranium Deposits Database (UDEPO)-IAEA 
World Nuclear Association > Public Information Service > country papers
WISE-Uranium
 Quellen radioaktiver Strahlung, weltweit - Google Maps (deutsch)

u